Bourke Airport  is an airport located  north of Bourke, New South Wales, Australia.

Facilities 

As part of the unemployment relief grant from the Civil Aviation Department made money available to build a second runway at the Bourke Aerodrome.

The airport was opened for access in 1943 as a base for World War II.

A radio location service was intended to be installed at the airport by August 1946.  Inquiries were also being made about lighting.  Butler's Douglas DC-3 was now making regular flights into Bourke by April 1946.

May 1949 saw a tender awarded to Amalgamated Wireless (Australasia) to install a radar-style distance measuring beacon, with 'DME', an omni-radio range installation.

Butler Air Transport Limited sought to have the airfield upgraded to support a possible change from the Douglas DC-3 to the Vickers Viscount, otherwise the Sydney–Bourke route was not economically viable.

The airport on Friday 7 December 1962 saw the town turn out to welcome Commonwealth Games high jumper medalist Percy Hobson (athlete) on his return.

An April 1964 meeting discussing a twenty-four hour service by air ambulance across NSW was met with skepticism as Bourke was not equipped for night landings or radio navigation beacons.

By 1965 Airlines of NSW was running flights to and Sydney on Tuesdays, Thursdays and Sundays.  Also at this time it was noted:
 The engineer at Bourke airport is Percy Weatherilt, 86, the oldest practising aircraft engineer in the world.  He still services some 40 private small aircraft which are owned by graziers in the Bourke district and used daily on their properties.

The 1970s saw complaints about the standard of toilet facilities, namely a small block.

The airport was used by the Royal Australian Air Force to bring in supplies during the floods in 1976 and 1990.

Airlines and destinations

Gallery

See also

List of airports in New South Wales

References

External links
Bourke Airport

Airports in New South Wales